Glasgow College was a parliamentary constituency in Glasgow.  It returned one Member of Parliament (MP) to the House of Commons of the Parliament of the United Kingdom, elected by the plurality voting system.

History

The constituency was created by the Redistribution of Seats Act 1885 for the 1885 general election, and abolished for the 1918 general election.

Boundaries
The Redistribution of Seats Act 1885 provided that the constituency was to consist of the Tenth and Eleventh Municipal Wards.

Members of Parliament

Elections

Elections in the 1880s

Elections in the 1890s

Elections in the 1900s

Elections in the 1910s 

General Election 1914–15:

Another General Election was required to take place before the end of 1915. The political parties had been making preparations for an election to take place and by July 1914, the following candidates had been selected; 
Liberal: Harry Watt
Unionist:

References

Historic parliamentary constituencies in Scotland (Westminster)
Constituencies of the Parliament of the United Kingdom established in 1885
Constituencies of the Parliament of the United Kingdom disestablished in 1918
Politics of Glasgow